Cerami is a surname. Notable people with the surname include:

 Anthony Cerami (born 1940), American entrepreneur and research scientist
 Pino Cerami (born 1922), Belgian road bicycle racer
 Rudy Cerami (born 1988), American football player
 Vincenzo Cerami (1940–2013), Italian screenwriter

See also
 Philagathus of Cerami, 12th century monk and preacher